Mass media in Kenya includes more than 91 FM stations, more than 64 free to view TV stations, and an unconfirmed number of print newspapers and magazines. Publications mainly use English as their primary language of communication, with some media houses employing Swahili. Vernacular or community-based languages are commonly used in broadcast media; mostly radio.

Kenya's state-owned Kenya Broadcasting Corporation broadcasts in both English and Swahili plus various vernacular languages. Royal Media services are the largest private national broadcaster with countrywide coverage. It also broadcasts in both English and Swahili plus various vernacular languages. A dozen private radio and television stations have ranges that are limited to the Nairobi area.

Legislation
The media in Kenya is regulated by a statutory body called the Media Council of Kenya. The Media Council of Kenya is an independent national institution established by the Media Act, 2007 as the leading institution in the regulation of media and the conduct and discipline of journalists. It is mandated to register and accredit journalists, register media establishments, handle complaints from the public and create and publish yearly media audit on the Media Freedom in Kenya among other things. During accreditation the journalists agree to adhere to the Code of Conduct and Practice of Journalism in Kenya, which was created by media practitioners and stakeholders with the view of making Journalism in Kenya a more professional and respectable field.  The media is also regulated by the Kenya Film Classification Board, a State Corporation under the Ministry of Information, Communication and Technology (ICT) which is mandated by the Films and Stage Plays Act Cap 222 Laws of Kenya to regulate the creation, possession, broadcasting, exhibition, and distribution of films in Kenya.

Radio

KBC, Citizen FM, Kiss FM (pop), Classic FM (classics), Capital FM (rock and pop), Easy FM (R&B), Metro FM (Reggae), X FM (Rock), Homeboyz Radio (Hip-hop and R&B) are the popular radio stations in Kenya in terms of listeners and coverage. Several established private radio stations broadcast in local vernacular languages, including Kameme FM, Gukena FM, Coro FM and Inooro FM (Kikuyu), Metro East FM (Hindi), Chamgei FM, Kass FM and Rehema Radio (Kalenjin), Lake Victoria (Luo), Mulembe FM (Luhya), Mbaitu FM (Kamba), Star FM (Somali).

However most radio are owned by few media companies. They include KBC, Nation Media Group, Standard Media Group, Radio Africa Group, Royal Media Service and Mediamax Network.

Television

NTV, KTN, Citizen TV, TV47 Kenya and K24 are the biggest TV stations in Kenya in terms of coverage and viewers. Recently entertainment TV ventured in the Kenyan airspace with the inclusion of Kiss TV, a 24-hour Music TV Station, and Classic TV which airs African content in terms of movies, programs, and music. But recently they joined together. Inooro TV and Kameme TV are the biggest vernacular TV Station that broadcast their program in Kikuyu. Digital TV is also available in Kenya with the likes of Smart TV and DStv.

More than 100 applications for radio and television licenses are pending before the Communications Authority of Kenya, which is the independent regulatory authority for the communications industry in Kenya. Its role is to license and regulate telecommunications, radio-communication, and postal/courier services in Kenya. Kenya's print media are diverse, ranging from well-respected newspapers and magazines to an expansive tabloid press.

Newspapers

There are two independent national daily newspapers, the Daily Nation, The Standard, and two daily free newspapers, X News, and The People Daily.  There are also two specialised daily papers, Business Daily and The Star, and one weekly paper, The East African, which is published in Nairobi, Dar es Salaam and Kampala.

Under the Kibaki government, the media have demonstrated greater editorial independence than in previous years, and the number of press freedom abuses have declined. Still, some media policies and incidents continue to inhibit press freedom, e.g., the need to post a costly bond before publication and to register afterward. In 2003 the government invoked a restrictive constitutional provision on-court coverage to intimidate journalists reporting on a possible political murder. In March 2006, hooded policemen raided the offices of The Standard newspaper and Kenya Television Network, claiming concerns about internal security.

Internet

All mainstream media houses have websites that they use to convey news and other information. The use of online magazines, blogs, and websites for Kenyan news is also on the rise.

Magazine
Kenya has several magazines most of which are published monthly and a few are bi-monthly. The magazines cover a range of topics such as business, lifestyle, politics, entertainment, media, and other societal issues.

All newspapers that are published are usually accomplished with a magazine in every daily edition.

Other notable companies also publish magazines for their client and publicity and advertisement. Some of these companies are Kenya Airways, Mada Hotels and ICPAK.

All other listed companies in the Nairobi Stock Exchange also publish their annual financial report.

See also
 Telecommunications in Kenya
 Telephone numbers in Kenya

References

Bibliography
 
 
  
  
 
 
 
 
 
  (Includes information about radio, periodicals, etc.)

External links
 Media Council of Kenya – Statutory Media Regulator
 Kenya Broadcasting Corporation – a government corporation
 List of Television in kenya
 Listen Kenya Radios Online
 Media and Telecommunication Landscape in Kenya, a infoasaid guide, November 2010, 80 pp.

 
Kenya
Kenya